The International Association for the Advancement of Teaching and Research in Intellectual Property (ATRIP) was founded in 1981. It pursues only educational and scientific objectives to contribute to the advancement of teaching and research in the field of the law of intellectual property.

See also 
 Intellectual property organization

References

External links 
 Official web site

Intellectual property organizations
Organizations established in 1981